The Yanshui River is a river in southern Taiwan. It flows through Tainan City for about 41.3 km. The wetlands at the river mouth fall partly in the Taijiang National Park.

See also
List of rivers in Taiwan

References

Rivers of Taiwan
Landforms of Tainan